British Hurricane was a British esports team for the video game Overwatch competing in Overwatch Contenders (OWC) and an academy team for the London Spitfire of the Overwatch League (OWL). The team was based in London, United Kingdom and played in the Europe region of OWC. Since inception, Hurricane won two regional and one interregional championships. In December 2021, the team announced that they would not be competing in future Contenders seasons.

Franchise history 
On 15 February 2018, the London Spitfire formally announced that their academy team for Overwatch Contenders Europe would be called the British Hurricane and revealed their all-European 2018 Season 1 squad. Cloud9 owner Jack Etienne worked with Code Red Esports owner Paul "ReDeYe" Chaloner and popular Overwatch YouTuber Tom "Stylosa" Stewart on helping them target the British demographic for their roster.

In their first season, the Hurricane took home the 2018 Season 1 European championship after defeating Team Gigantti 4–3 in the European Overwatch Contenders Grand Finals. Following, the team defeated North America Contenders Champions Fusion University in the 2018 Atlantic Showdown by a score of 3–1. Hurricane struggled in 2018 Season 2 – only amassing one win – and was dropped down to Contenders Trials for Season 3, where they finished atop the rankings and joined Contenders 2018 Season 3. They were able to qualify for the Season 3 playoffs but fell to Team Gigantti in the quarterfinals.

British Hurricane had a dominant performance in 2019 Season 1, as the team went a perfect 7–0 in the European region, and made it to the Europe Grand Finals for the second time in two years. However, they fell to the German-based team Angry Titans in the finals by a score of 1–4. Due to their performance in Season 1, the team qualified for the 2019 Atlantic Showdown – a double-elimination interregional tournament. After defeating Lowkey Esports in Round 1 and losing to Team Envy in the bottom-half bracket, the team was eliminated by ATL Academy by a score of 0–3, placing 5th in the tournament.

On 17 December 2021, Cloud9 announced that British Hurricane would cease operations at the end of 2021.

Seasons overview

OWL buyouts and promotions 
All Overwatch Contenders players are eligible to be promoted by their affiliated Overwatch League team or signed to any other Overwatch League during specified non-blackout periods.

2018 
DPS Finley "Kyb" Adisi was signed by expansion team Guangzhou Charge on 22 November.

2021 
Tank Ilari "Vestola" Vestola was signed by Paris Eternal as their new starting off-tank on 2 June.
Support Oliver "Admiral" Vahar was promoted to the London Spitfire on 9 December.

References 

Overwatch League academy teams
Esports teams established in 2018
2018 establishments in England
Esports teams based in the United Kingdom
London Spitfire
Esports teams disestablished in 2021